Admire Vega, (12 March 1996 – 29 October 2004) was a Japanese Thoroughbred racehorse and sire. As a two-year-old in 1998 he won two of his three races including the Grade III Radio Tampa Hai Sansai Stakes. In the following spring he was beaten in his first two starts before recording his greatest success when defeating a strong field in the Tokyo Yushun. In the autumn he added a win in the Grade II Kyoto Shimbun Hai before being retired in 2000. He had some success in a brief stud career before dying at the age of eight.

Background
Admire Vega was a bay horse with a white blaze and a white sock on his left hind leg bred in Japan by the Yoshida family's Northern Farm. He was smaller than average for a male Thoroughbred, with a maximum racing weight of 464 kg. He was sired by Sunday Silence, who won the 1989 Kentucky Derby, before retiring to stud in Japan where he was champion sire on thirteen consecutive occasions. His other major winners included Deep Impact, Stay Gold, Heart's Cry, Manhattan Cafe, Zenno Rob Roy and Neo Universe. Admire Vega's dam Vega was an outstanding racemare who won the Oka Sho and the Yushun Himba in 1993. As a broodmare Vega also produced the multiple Grade I winner Admire Don and Historic Star, the dam of Harp Star. Vega was a descendant of the American mare Nellie Morse, making her a distant relative of Bold Forbes and Bet Twice.

The colt was acquired by Riichi Kondo and was sent into training with Mitsuru Hashida.

Racing career

1998: two-year-old season
Admire Vega began his racing career by finishing fourth to Mayano Matador in a 1600-metre maiden race at Kyoto Racecourse on 7 November and recorded his first win four weeks later when he won the Erica Sho over 2000 metres at Hanshin Racecourse. On 26 December the colt was moved up in class for the Grade III Radio Tampa Hai Sansai Stakes over the same course and distance as the Erica Sho. He gained his first major success as he won from Matikane Kinnohosi and Osumi Bright.

1999: three-year-old season
On his three-year-old debut Admire Vega contested the Grade II Hochi Hai Yayoi Sho over 2000 metres at Nakayama Racecourse on 7 March and finished second to Narita Top Road. In the Grade I Satsuki Sho over the same course and distance on 18 April he finished sixth, three lengths behind T M Opera O, who won from Osumi Bright and Narita Top Road. On 6 June Admire Vega was moved up in distance to contest the sixty-sixth running of the Tokyo Yushun over 2400 metres at Tokyo Racecourse. Ridden by Yutaka Take he faced seventeen opponents including T M Opera O, Narita Top Road and Osumi Bright. He won by a neck from Narita Top Road, with T M Opera O a length and a quarter back in third place.

After a break of more than four months Admire Vega returned in the Group Two Kyoto Shimbun Hai at Kyoto on 17 October and won from Narita Top Road. For his final race the colt was moved up in distance for the Grade I Kikuka Sho over 3000 metres at Kyoto on 7 November. He finished sixth of the fifteen runners, four lengths behind Narita Top Road, who won by a neck from T M Opera O.

He remained in training as a four-year-old but suffered from ligament problems and did not race again.

Stud record
Admire Vega was retired from racing to become a breeding stallion at Shadai Stallion Station. He had some success in four seasons at stud, siring the Grade I winners Kiss to Heaven (Oka Sho) and Blumenblatt (Mile Championship). He died in October 2004 at the age of eight.

Pedigree

References 

1996 racehorse births
2004 racehorse deaths
Racehorses bred in Japan
Racehorses trained in Japan
Thoroughbred family 9-f